The Regiment "Lancieri di Novara" (5th) ( - "Lancers of Novara") is a cavalry unit of the Italian Army based in Codroipo in Friuli Venezia Giulia. The regiment is the reconnaissance unit of the 132nd Armored Brigade "Ariete".

History

Formation 
On 24 December 1828 the Regiment "Dragoni di Piemonte" (Dragoons of Piedmont) was formed in Vigevano with personnel drawn from four existing Royal Sardinian Army cavalry regiments: Regiment "Cavalleggeri di Piemonte", Regiment "Cavalleggeri di Savoia", Regiment "Piemonte Reale Cavalleria", and Regiment "Dragoni del Génévois". The new regiment received untamed horses directly from the army's herds and fielded 900 dragoons and 784 horses in eight squadrons, which were grouped in four divisions.

On 29 August 1831 the regiment was reduced to six squadrons and on 3 January 1832 the regiment was renamed Regiment "Novara Cavalleria". The regiment's identifying color was originally orange, but in 1839 it was changed to white, which is still used in the regiment's gorget patches today.

Italian Wars of Independence 
In 1848-49 the regiment fought in the First Italian War of Independence, during which it was decorated with a Bronze Medal for Military Valour for its conduct in the Battle of Santa Lucia at the gates of Verona on 6 May 1848. After the defeat in the First Italian War of Independence the Kingdom of Sardinia reformed its military and on 3 January 1850 the Novara was reorganized as a Chevau-léger unit and renamed Regiment "Cavalleggeri di Novara". On the same date the regiment was reduced to four squadrons, with the Novara's 5th and 6th squadron used to form the Regiment "Cavalleggeri di Alessandria".

In 1855 the Novara's 1st Squadron was part of the Sardinian expeditionary corps' Provisional Light Cavalry Regiment, which fought in the Crimean War and distinguished itself on 16 August 1855 in the Battle of the Chernaya.

In the Second Italian War of Independence in 1859 the regiment distinguished itself in the battle of Montebello and was awarded a second Bronze Medal for Military Valour. On 6 June 1860 the regiment received lances and was renamed Regiment "Lancieri di Novara".

In the 1860-1861 the regiment participated in the campaign in central and southern Italy. During this campaign the regiment was awarded two additional Bronze Medals for Military Valour: one for its conduct in the Battle of Castelfidardo in 1860 and one for the Battle of Macerone. In the latter battle the regiment captured the flag of the 8th Line Jäger Battalion of the Army of the Two Sicilies of the Kingdom of the Two Sicilies.

In 1866 the regiment fought in the Third Italian War of Independence and in 1870 it participated in the capture of Rome. Over the next years the regiment repeatedly changed its name:

 10 September 1871: 5th Regiment of Cavalry (Novara)
 5 November 1876: Cavalry Regiment "Novara" (5th)
 16 December 1897: Regiment "Lancieri di Novara" (5th)

In 1887 the regiment contributed to the formation of the Mounted Hunters Squadron, which fought in the Italo-Ethiopian War of 1887–1889. In 1895-96 the regiment provided one officer and 75 enlisted for units deployed to Italian Eritrea for the First Italo-Ethiopian War. In 1911-12 the regiment provided 41 enlisted personnel to augment units fighting in the Italo-Turkish War. Between the Second Italian War of Independence and World War I the Novara ceded on three occasions one of its squadrons to help form new regiments:

 16 September 1859: Regiment "Cavalleggeri di Montebello" (8th) (later renamed Regiment "Lancieri di Montebello" (8th))
 16 February 1864: Regiment "Lancieri di Foggia" (later renamed: Regiment "Cavalleggeri di Foggia" 11th))
 1 October 1909: Regiment "Lancieri di Vercelli" (26th)

World War I 

At the outbreak of World War I the regiment consisted of a command, the regimental depot, and two cavalry groups, with the I Group consisting of three squadrons and the II Group consisting of two squadrons and a machine gun section. Together with the Regiment "Genova Cavalleria" (4th) the Novara formed the II Cavalry Brigade of the 1st Cavalry Division of "Friuli". The division fought dismounted in the trenches of the Italian Front. In 1916 the regiment was reinforced with the 2nd Squadron of the Regiment "Cavalleggeri di Lodi" (15th). In December 1916 the division was sent to Treviso, mounted on horses again and held in reserve.

In 1917 the regimental depot in Treviso formed the 735th and 1354th dismounted machine gunners companies as reinforcement for infantry units on the front. After the Italian defeat in the Battle of Caporetto the II Cavalry Brigade, together with the II/25th Battalion and III/26th Battalion of the Infantry Brigade "Bergamo", stalled the Austro-Hungarian advance on 30 October 1917 in the Battle of Pozzuolo del Friuli, which allowed the Italian III Army to escape across the Tagliamento river. Both cavalry regiments were awarded a Silver Medal for Military Valour for the successful delay of the Austrian advance.

In 1918 the regiment fought in the Second Battle of the Piave River. After the Italian victory in the Battle of Vittorio Veneto, the regiment, like all cavalry regiments, was ordered to advance as fast as far as possible and so on 2 November 1918 the regiment arrived in Carnia, where it captured the retreating Austro-Hungarian 34th Infantry Division.

Interwar years 
After the war the Italian Army disbanded 14 of its 30 cavalry regiments and so on 21 November 1919 the II Group of the Novara was renamed "Cavalleggeri di Piacenza" as it consisted of personnel and horses from the disbanded Regiment "Cavalleggeri di Piacenza" (18th). On 20 May 1920 the Novara lost its lances and was renamed Regiment "Cavalleggeri di Novara". On the same day the Novara received and integrated a squadron of the disbanded Regiment "Lancieri di Milano" (7th) and received the traditions of the Regiment "Cavalleggeri di Piacenza" (18th).

In 1921 the regiment moved from Treviso to Parma. On 8 February 1934 the regiment was renamed Regiment "Lancieri di Novara". The same year the regiment moved from Parma to Verona. On 1 November 1934 the 3rd Cavalry Division "Principe Amedeo Duca d'Aosta" was formed in Milan. The division consisted of the III Cavalry Brigade "Principe Amedeo Duca d'Aosta" and the 3rd Cavalry Artillery Regiment. The cavalry brigade consisted of the regiments Regiment "Savoia Cavalleria" (3rd) and Regiment "Lancieri di Novara" (5th), and the 8th Bersaglieri Regiment. On 1 February 1938 the III Cavalry Brigade "Principe Amedeo Duca d'Aosta" was dissolved and the brigade's units came under direct command of the division.

In 1935, the regiment formed the XII Fast Tanks Squadron, which was sent to Eritrea for the Second Italo-Ethiopian War.

World War II 

At the outbreak of World War II the regiment consisted of a command, a command squadron, the I and II squadrons groups, each with two mounted squadrons, and the 5th Machine Gunners Squadron. The regiment was still assigned together with the Regiment "Savoia Cavalleria" to the 3rd Cavalry Division "Principe Amedeo Duca d'Aosta", which participated in the Invasion of Yugoslavia. In summer 1941 the division was sent to the Eastern front.

On 20 July 1941 the division left Italy and on 13 August 1941 it reached Dniprodzerzhynsk (today Kamianske) on the Dnieper river in central Ukraine. When it arrived in Ukraine the Novara fielded 880 troops (including 45 officers and 43 non-commissioned officers) with 760 horses. In October 1941 the regiment fought in the battle to take control of Donetsk and Horlivka. From late autumn 1941 until 5 December 1941, the regiment defended Nikitovka against superior forces of the Soviet 74th Rifle Division.

By early 1942, the regiment had lost 15 officers and 100 lancers and half its horses. On 15 March 1942 division's two cavalry regiments and the horse artillery regiment, as well as the III Fast Tanks Group "San Giorgio" left the division and formed the Horse Troops Grouping under direct command of the 8th Italian Army. In summer 1942 the Novara participated in the occupation of Krasnyi Luch. For this operation, the regiment was awarded its second Silver Medal of Military Valour.

In late August 1942, the regiment, reinforced by artillery, occupied and defended Yagodnyi to defend the right flank of the 2nd Infantry Division "Sforzesca". For the defence of Yagodnyi, during which the Novara conducted the second-last wartime cavalry charge, the Novara was awarded with a Gold Medal of Military Valour. After Yagodnyi the Novara, together the Alpini Battalion "Monte Cervino", Alpini Battalion "Val Chiese", 54th Infantry Regiment "Sforzesca" and an howitzer group of the 17th Artillery Regiment "Sforzesca", defended the Zuzkan Valley until 23 September.

On 17 December the Red Army began Operation Little Saturn and under immense pressure of superior Soviet armored forces the Italian divisions had to retreat from the Don the next day, but the motorized Soviet formations overtook the Italians and forced the Italians repeatedly to fight their way through Soviet defensive lines on their way towards Axis lines. The Novara's survivors were repatriated on 23 March 1943 and on 30 March the regiment's flag returned to regiment's garrison in Verona. In July 1943 the regiment moved to Medicina to begin the process of being brought back up to full strength. After the announcement of the Armistice of Cassibile on 8 September 1943 invading German forces captured two training squadrons in Medicina. The rest of the regiment was disbanded on 17 September 1943, after having hidden the regimental flag.

During the regiment's deployment to russia the regiment's depot in Verona formed the:
 III Tanks Group "Lancieri di Novara", with L6/40 tanks
 V Machine Gunners Group "Lancieri di Novara"
 V Dismounted Group "Lancieri di Novara"
 VI Dismounted Group "Lancieri di Novara"
 XVI Dismounted Group "Lancieri di Novara"
 XXV Dismounted Group "Lancieri di Novara"

In North Africa, the V Machine Gunners Group "Lancieri di Novara" was overwhelmed by enemy forces in the Battle of the Mareth Line and was forced to retreat on 27 March 1943 with heavy losses. On 7 April, the remnants of the group were assigned to the 131st Armored Division "Centauro" and occupied positions at Abd El Rahnane. On 8 April, the group, together with the III Armored Group "Cavalleggeri di Monferrato", reached Takrouna, to the West of Enfidaville. On 20 and 21 April, the group was hit by Anglo-American armored forces near Gebel Gargi. The group resisted valiantly and only thirty lancers escaped. On 22 April the remnants of the group were assigned to the Grouping "Lequio" and participated in the operations in Cape Bon until they surrendered on 11 May 1943.

Cold War 
On 1 September 1946 the 5th Lancers Reconnaissance Group was formed in Coverciano in Florence. In 1947 the group moved from Florence to Codroipo, where it still resides today. On 1 February 1949 the group was expanded to 5th Armored Cavalry Regiment "Lancieri di Novara". The regiment consisted of a command, a command squadron, and two squadrons groups equipped with M26 Pershing tanks. In September 1951 the regiment formed the III Squadrons Group. On 1 April 1957 the regiment was assigned to the newly formed Cavalry Brigade in Gradisca d'Isonzo and on 4 November 1958 the regiment was renamed Regiment "Lancieri di Novara" (5th).

On 1 March 1964 the regiment transferred one of its squadrons group to the 32nd Tank Regiment, where it became the V Tank Battalion. On 30 September 1964 the regiment was reduced to Squadrons Group "Lancieri di Novara".

During the 1975 army reform the army disbanded the regimental level and newly independent battalions were granted for the first time their own flags. On 1 October 197s the squadrons group was reorganized and renamed 5th Tank Squadrons Group "Lancieri di Novara" and assigned the flag and traditions of the Regiment "Lancieri di Novara" (5th). The squadrons group was assigned to the Armored Brigade "Pozzuolo del Friuli" and consisted of a command, a command and services squadron, and three tank squadrons equipped with Leopard 1A2 main battle tanks.

For its conduct and work after the 1976 Friuli earthquake the squadrons group was awarded a Bronze Medal of Army Valour, which was affixed to the squadron group's flag and added to the squadron group's coat of arms.

Recent times 
On 4 September 1992 the 5th Tank Squadrons Group "Lancieri di Novara" lost its autonomy and the next day the squadrons group entered the newly formed Regiment "Lancieri di Novara" (5th). The regiment consisted of a command, a command and services squadron, and a squadrons group with three armored squadrons equipped with wheeled Centauro tank destroyers.

From 8 January to 31 March 1994 one of the regiment's squadrons was deployed to Somalia as part of the United Nations Operation in Somalia II. In January 2013 the regiment was transferred from the Cavalry Brigade "Pozzuolo del Friuli" to the 132nd Armored Brigade "Ariete".

Current structure 
As of 2022 the Regiment "Lancieri di Novara" (5th) consists of:

  Regimental Command, in Codroipo
 Command and Logistic Support Squadron "Pozzuolo"
 1st Reconnaissance Squadrons Group
 1st Reconnaissance Squadron "Macerone"
 2nd Reconnaissance Squadron "Jagodnij"
 3rd Reconnaissance Squadron "Montebello"
 Heavy Armored Squadron "Deir El Qattara"

The Command and Logistic Support Squadron fields the following platoons: C3 Platoon, Transport and Materiel Platoon, Medical Platoon, and Commissariat Platoon. The three reconnaissance squadrons are equipped with VTLM Lince vehicles and Centauro tank destroyers, the latter of which are scheduled to be replaced by Freccia reconnaissance vehicles. The Heavy Armor Squadron is equipped with Centauro tank destroyers, which are being replaced by Centauro II tank destroyers.

See also 
 132nd Armored Brigade "Ariete"

External links
 Italian Army Website: Reggimento "Lancieri di Novara" (5°)

References

L
L
L
Cavalry Regiments of Italy